Huluganga Falls is a waterfall located at Huluganga Town, about 30 kilometers away from Kandy Town in  on the way of  Bambarella, in Kandy District in Sri Lanka. Hulu River is originating from the Knuckles Mountain Range. Huluganga Falls is about 75 meters in height. The cascading water sprinkles the villages of Elliyadda and Aratthana, before flowing to the Victoria Reservoir.

There are many rocks on the river and even on the rainy days the water does not get muddy because of rocks, grass and plants, as well as less environmental pollution.

External links
Huluganga Falls at Sri Lankan Waterfalls

Landforms of Kandy District
Waterfalls of Sri Lanka
Waterfalls in Central Province, Sri Lanka
Geography of Kandy District